Saxa Q'awa (Aymara saxa hollow, q'awa little river, ditch, crevice, fissure, gap in the earth, "hollow brook", hispanicized spelling Sacsajahua) is a mountain in the Wansu mountain range in the Andes of Peru, about  high. It is situated in the Arequipa Region, Condesuyos Province, Cayarani District. Saxa Q'awa lies south of Janq'u Q'awa between the Puma Ranra valley in the west and a lake name Anqasqucha (Quechua for "blue lake") in the east.

References 

Mountains of Peru
Mountains of Arequipa Region